Fay Marvin Clark (born 1907, La Crosse, Wisconsin, died 1991) was a real-estate developer, entrepreneur and politician. He developed several plots of land in Hiawatha, Iowa, and became mayor of the town from 1950 to 1958, and again from 1961 to 1963. Clark was interested in spirituality and the paranormal, and reported many out of body experiences.

References 
"Fay Clark: The Spiritual Swashbuckler," Des Moines Register Picture Magazine
Fay Clark: You Will Take it With You, Hiawatha Publishing

Fay Clark. Into the Light. Perry, Iowa: Pyramid Publishers of Iowa, 1988.

1907 births
1991 deaths
People from Hiawatha, Iowa
Politicians from La Crosse, Wisconsin
Mayors of places in Iowa
Writers from Iowa
Writers from La Crosse, Wisconsin
20th-century American businesspeople
20th-century American politicians